The Roi de Rome ("King of Rome") was a first-rate 118-gun ship of the line of the French Navy, of the Océan type, designed by Jacques-Noël Sané.

Ordered as Sans Pareil, she was renamed successively Roi de Rome, Inflexible and back to the Roi de Rome in 1812 alone.

She remained in an unfinished state until 1816, when some of her wood was found to have rotted, and she was broken up. The sound timbers were used for the refitting of Wagram.

A model of a 80-gun two-decker named Roi de Rome (CnAM 4024) is on display at the Musée des Arts et Métiers in Paris; the ship is fictitious and bears no connection to 120-gun Roi de Rome.

References
 Notes

 Bibliography

Ships of the line of the French Navy
Océan-class ships of the line